These are the late night schedules on all three networks for each calendar season beginning September 1964. All times are Eastern/Pacific.

1964 marked the debut of Les Crane's short-lived talk show on ABC, the first time since 1955 that any network other than NBC had offered non-news programming in the late-night time slot. Crane's show ended after less than a season.

NET is not included, as member television stations have local flexibility over most of their schedules and broadcast times for network shows may vary, ABC is not included on the weekend schedules (as the network do not offer late night programs of any kind on weekends).

Talk/Variety shows are highlighted in yellow, Local News & Programs are highlighted in white.

Monday-Friday

Saturday/Sunday

Beginning in January, repeats of The Tonight Show are scheduled on late Saturday and Sunday nights as The Saturday or Sunday Tonight Show.

By network

ABC

New Series
The Les Crane Show
ABC's Nightlife *
ABC's Nightlife with Les Crane *

Not returning from 1963-64
The Jerry Lewis Show

NBC

Returning Series
The Tonight Show Starring Johnny Carson

New Series
The Saturday/Sunday Tonight Show *

United States late night network television schedules
1964 in American television
1965 in American television